Lars-Gunnar Björklund (24 February 1937 in Stockholm, Sweden – 30 November 2012 in Sankt Matteus Parish, Stockholm, Sweden) was a Swedish radio and TV journalist. He was famous as a sports reporter, especially reporting from Vasaloppet and the Ice Hockey World Championships.

Early years
As a student Björklund attended the Adolf Fredrik's Music School in Stockholm. He played handball for Djurgårdens IF.

References

1937 births
2012 deaths
Swedish sports journalists
Swedish male handball players
Djurgårdens IF Handboll players